Choo Soo-Hyun (born March 5, 1988) is a South Korean actress.

Filmography

Television series

Music video

References

External links 
 Choo Soo-hyun at Popeye Entertainment 
 Choo Soo-hyun Fan Cafe at Daum 
 
 

1988 births
Living people
21st-century South Korean actresses
South Korean television actresses
Place of birth missing (living people)